Memorial University of Newfoundland, also known as Memorial University or MUN, is a public university in the province of Newfoundland and Labrador, based in St. John's, with satellite campuses in Corner Brook, elsewhere in Newfoundland and in Labrador, Saint Pierre, and Harlow, England.  
Memorial University offers certificate, diploma, undergraduate, graduate, and post-graduate programs, as well as online courses and degrees.

Founded in September 1925 as a living memorial to Newfoundlanders and Labradorians who died in the First World War, Memorial is the largest university in Atlantic Canada, and Newfoundland and Labrador's only university. As of 2018, there were a reported 1,330 faculty and 2,474 staff, supporting 18,000 students from nearly 100 countries.

History

Founding
At its founding, Newfoundland was a dominion of the United Kingdom.
Memorial University began as Memorial University College (MUC), which opened in September 1925 at a campus on Parade Street in St. John's. It was founded to honour the war dead from World War I, to provide a way of educating school teachers for the local religious schools, and to offer students higher education locally. Before that, there was no post-secondary education in the dominion with high ranking; students often went to Canada, the United Kingdom, or the United States.  Students were first admitted into a non-degree program in 1925. The original location on Parade Street in St. Johns was established with the help of a grant from the Carnegie Corporation of New York.

The college was established as a memorial to the Newfoundlanders who had lost their lives on active service during the First World War. It was later rededicated to also encompass the province's war dead of the Second World War.

The first president was J. L. Paton. It offered the first two years of university studies. MUC's initial enrolment was 57 students, rising to a peak of over 400 in the 1940s. In 1933 it merged with the adjacent Normal School and took responsibility for teacher training.

Early period
The period from the founding in 1925 until 1949 in Newfoundland was chaotic, reflecting Newfoundland's shifting economic and political situation, from the last flowering of independence to depression and life on the dole. The 1940 discovery of Newfoundland as a strategic military asset brought a new period of prosperity. Enrolment at the university went through ups and downs during this period, reflecting the shifting fortunes of Newfoundland.

Newfoundland gave up dominion status in 1934, ending self-government in exchange for British Commission of Government rule as a crown colony. Newfoundland remained a crown colony until it joined Canada as a province in 1949.

The post-Confederation government elevated the status of Memorial University College to full university status in August 1949, renaming the institution to Memorial University of Newfoundland. Memorial University was established by the Memorial University Act.

The enrolment in Memorial's first year was 307 students.

Expansion

In 1959 Memorial pioneered the Extension Service as a model for field education and community development.

In 1961, enrolment having increased to 1400, Memorial moved from Parade Street to its present location on Elizabeth Avenue (Main Campus).

On 8 March 1965, the government of Newfoundland announced free tuition for first-year students enrolled at Memorial University in St. John's.
The Faculty of Medicine of Memorial University of Newfoundland was established in 1967, and the first students were admitted in 1969. It admits approximately 80 students into the M.D. program each year, and also offers MSc and PhD programs.

Memorial maintains a campus in Harlow, England which opened to students in 1969. This campus has been a popular location for internships in education, and now offers credit courses, work terms, and internships in a number of areas. The campus accommodates approximately 50 students.

Memorial established the Institut Frecker in St. Pierre in 1973, to offer one-semester French immersion programs. It was housed in a building provided by the archdiocese of St. Pierre until 2000. Now known as the Program Frecker, it is currently run from the FrancoForum, a language teaching facility owned by the government of St. Pierre. The program is partially supported by the governments of Canada and Newfoundland and Labrador.

In September 1975 a campus was opened in Corner Brook; it was first renamed Sir Wilfred Grenfell College in 1979 and renamed again in 2010 as Grenfell Campus, Memorial University of Newfoundland.  Currently, 1300 students attend Grenfell, which offers full degree programs in several disciplines, including Fine Arts, and partial programs, which can be completed at the main campus, in many other subjects.

In 1977, the Memorial University of Newfoundland Educational Television Centre implemented the Telemedicine project.

In 1992, the Institute of Fisheries and Marine Technology in St. John's became affiliated with Memorial University as the Fisheries and Marine Institute of Memorial University of Newfoundland.  Today it is named the Marine Institute of Memorial University of Newfoundland. It offers both degree and non-degree programs with a high place in international ranking systems.

The modern day
In 2008, the university's hiring process for incoming presidents came under scrutiny for political interference by the province's education minister, Joan Shea.

In May 2021, the Board of Regents of Memorial University recommended that the institution should proceed with officially changing its name to Memorial University of Newfoundland and Labrador. However, changing the university's legal name will require an act of the province's House of Assembly, and has not yet taken effect.

In September 2019, the Memorial University Senate voted unanimously to create a degree-granting campus in Labrador. Memorial University subsequently established the School of Arctic and Sub-Arctic Studies in 2020. A campus in Happy Valley-Goose Bay (renovated from the former provincial courthouse on Hamilton River Road) is expected to offer courses in Fall 2022.

Presidents

John Lewis Paton (1925 to 1933)
Albert Hatcher (1933 to 1952)
Raymond Gushue (1952 to 1966)
Moses Morgan (pro tempore, 1966 to 1967)
The Rt. Hon. The Lord Taylor of Harlow (1967 to 1973)
Moses Morgan (1973 to 1981)
Leslie Harris (1981 to 1990)
Arthur May (1990 to 1999)
Axel Meisen (1999 to 2007)
Eddy Campbell (pro tempore, 2008 to 2009)
Chris Loomis (pro tempore, 2009 to 2010)
Gary Kachanoski (2010 to 2020)
Vianne Timmons (2020 to present)

Chancellors

Viscount Rothermere of Hemsted (1952 to 1961)
Lord Thomson of Fleet (1961 to 1968)
G. Alain Frecker (1971 to 1979)
Paul G. Desmarais (1979 to 1988)
John Crosbie (1994 to 2008)
Rick Hillier (2008 to 2012)
Susan Dyer Knight (2012 to 2022)
Earl Ludlow (2022 to present)

Motto, shield, and arms
The university's motto is Provehito in Altum, 'to launch forth into the deep'. The arms of the university, designed by Alan Beddoe, have as their charges a cross moline, three books, and waves representing the sea, and were registered with the Canadian Heraldic Authority on 10 September 1992.

Academics

Schools and faculties
Memorial has seven faculties (Arts, Business Administration, Education, Engineering, Medicine, Nursing, and Science) and six Schools (Graduate Studies, Music, Pharmacy, Human Kinetics, Recreation, and Social Work). These offer a wide variety of undergraduate and graduate degree programs.

Memorial's Faculty of Business Administration is recognised as a leader in Canadian business education with a high ranking, offering programs at undergraduate and graduate levels, including a bachelor of commerce, international bachelor of business administration, bachelor of business administration, master of business administration, master of employment relations and PhD degrees.

Students can choose to specialise in the following engineering disciplines: Civil Engineering, Computer Engineering, Electrical Engineering, Mechanical Engineering, Ocean and Naval Architectural Engineering (combined degree), Engineering Management, and Process Engineering.

The St. John's campus is home to the Faculty of Medicine co-located with the Newfoundland Health Science Center General Hospital. The Faculty of Medicine grants undergraduate and graduate degrees in medicine, while also providing residential and advanced training. It is one of only four medical schools in Atlantic Canada (the others are Dalhousie University Faculty of Medicine, University of New Brunswick Medical Training Centre and Université de Moncton Medical Training Centre.

The Department of Biochemistry has a dietetic program accredited by the Dietitians of Canada and the university's graduates may subsequently become registered dietitians.

Queen's College, an affiliated College of Memorial University, offers diploma and degree studies in theology, pastoral studies, church history, and related programs. It is an associate member of the Association of Theological Schools in the United States and Canada and has 166 students.

The university operates the Bonne Bay Marine Station in Gros Morne National Park.

Research 
Research at Memorial University spans six faculties and six schools on the St. John's campus, three schools at Grenfell Campus, and three schools at the Marine Institute, covering a broad range of basic, interdisciplinary, and applied research topics. It also includes specialised centres in marine learning that study ocean technology, aquaculture, sustainable fishery, and offshore safety. Over 40% of Memorial's research is ocean-related (68% in the Faculty of Science alone).

Memorial University recently joined with Dalhousie University and the University of Prince Edward Island to form the Ocean Frontier Institute, a collaborative research initiative aimed at harnessing the vast potential of the world's oceans. Memorial University is a member of the University of the Arctic, an international cooperative network of universities, colleges, and other organizations concerned with education and research in Arctic region. Memorial is also a member of the International Association of Universities, Universities Canada, Association of Commonwealth Universities, Canadian Virtual University, and the Canadian Bureau for International Education.

In 2009, Memorial University launched Yaffle to provide researchers and community partners an opportunity to connect and exchange ideas, expertise, research interests, and publicly engaged activities in an open and accessible way. Yaffle is managed by the Leslie Harris Centre of Regional Policy and Development at Memorial University.

Research impact 
Out of 50 universities in Canada, Research Infosource ranked Memorial University the 20th most research-intensive for fiscal year 2016, with a sponsored research income of $91.178 million, averaging $93,500 per faculty member. Times Higher Education ranked Memorial University 17th among Canadian universities for subject-normalised total citations.

According to Memorial University's President's Report 2017, Memorial's total research funding for fiscal year 2016-17 was over $100 million. Memorial is the seat of 20 active Canada Research Chairs, and 13 sponsored research chairs.

Research centres and institutes 

Memorial University operates and manages over 30 research units. Some fall under the direct authority of their respective faculties or schools, while others have a pan-university mandate or multi-organization consortium. Below is a sampling of the more prominent units:

 Aging Research Centre – Newfoundland and Labrador
 Autonomous Oceans Systems Laboratory
 Bonne Bay Marine Station
 Boreal Ecosystem Research Initiative, Grenfell Campus
 Bruneau Centre for Excellence in Choral Music
 Centre for Applied Ocean Technology, Marine Institute
 Centre for Aquaculture and Seafood Development (CASD), Marine Institute
 Centre for Fisheries Ecosystems Research, Marine Institute
 Centre for Marine Simulation (CMS), Marine Institute
 Centre for Sustainable Aquatic Resources (CSAR), Marine Institute
 Craig L. Dobbin Genetics Research Centre
 Digital Research Centre for Qualitative Fieldwork
 eHealth Research Unit
 English Language Research Centre
 Environmental Policy Institute, Grenfell Campus
 Folklore and Language Archive (MUNFLA)
 Health Research Unit
 Hibernia Enhanced Oil Recovery Laboratory
 Institute of Social and Economic Research
 Janeway Pediatric Research Unit
 Lewisporte Regional Fisheries and Marine Centre
 Maritime History Archive
 Newfoundland and Labrador Centre for Applied Health Research
 North West River Research Station, Labrador Institute
 Nursing Research Unit
 Ocean Engineering Research Centre (OERC)
 Ocean Frontier Institute (OFI)
 Ocean Sciences Centre
 Offshore Safety and Survival Centre (OSSC), Marine Institute
 Primary Healthcare Research Unit
 Research Centre for the Study of Music, Media, and Place (MMaP)
 SafetyNet
 Support for People and Patient-Oriented Research and Trials (SUPPORT) Unit
 The Centre for Risk, Integrity and Safety Engineering (CRISE)
 The J.R. Smallwood Foundation for Newfoundland and Labrador Studies

Research awards and honours

Exchange programs
Presently, Memorial has 134 student programs, exchanges, and research partnership agreements in 40 countries. The Internationalization Office, formerly the International Student Advising Office, stands available to assist international students with housing, health insurance, academics, immigration, and career options. Memorial also has a British campus in Harlow, Essex, and is one of only two universities in Canada with a foothold in the United Kingdom.

Rankings 

In Maclean's 2023 Canadian university rankings, Memorial University of Newfoundland placed seventh in the magazine's comprehensive university category. The university has also placed in several global university rankings. In 2022 Academic Ranking of World Universities, the university ranked 701–800 in the world. The 2023 QS World University Rankings ranked the university 751–800 in the world. 2023 Times Higher Education World University Rankings placed the university 601–800 in the world. In the U.S. News & World Report 2022–23 ranking, the university placed 698th in the world.

Campuses and facilities
Memorial University has the following campuses: main Campus on Elizabeth Avenue, Signal Hill, St. John's, Grenfell Campus, Corner Brook, Bonne Bay Marine Station, Holyrood Marine Base, Labrador Institute, Happy Valley-Goose Bay, Ocean Sciences Centre, Institut Frecker on the French island of St-Pierre, off Newfoundland's south coast, and in Harlow, England. The main campus in St. John's, Newfoundland and Labrador is split by Prince Philip Drive.
 The university also operates the Memorial University of Newfoundland Botanical Garden.

St. John's campus
The largest campus is located in St. John's. Prince Philip Drive runs east–west through the main campus, with Westerland Road bordering it to the west, Elizabeth Avenue to the south, and Allandale Road to the east. The majority of the academic buildings are located south of Prince Philip Drive; the Arts and Administration building, the Science building, Chemistry and Physics, Mathematics, Music, Education, Physical Education, and the Bruneau Centre for Research and Innovation. The University Centre is home to the food court, bookstore, campus bar ("Breezeway"), and the CHMR-FM campus radio station.

Libraries and archives
The Memorial University Libraries contain collections of university Archives, Fine Arts from the 1880s to present; Human History and Natural Sciences. Memorial University of Newfoundland Folklore and Language Archive collection consists of manuscripts, tapes, records, photographs and artifacts pertaining to Maritime Provinces, specifically Newfoundland and Labrador. The Queen Elizabeth II Library contains 1,072,588 monographs, 104,587 maps, 5,655 audio-visual titles and 9,081 journal titles. The Commons, located on the main floor of the library, has computers available for use by students as well as a Digital Media Centre.

Marine Institute
The Marine Institute is a marine polytechnic institution located on Ridge Road in St. John's within Pippy Park, north of the city. It has unique facilities such as a full ship's bridge simulator and the world's largest flume tank. It offers degrees, diplomas, certifications and industry training for the maritime sector.

Grenfell Campus
Grenfell Campus is a  site in Corner Brook. It has approximately 1400 students, 156 faculty, and 235 staff and offers programs in the Arts, Fine Arts, Business, Science, and Nursing. It was formerly known as Sir Wilfred Grenfell College until 10 September 2010.

Harlow

The Harlow Campus, located in Old Harlow, Essex, England consists of the Maltings, which can accommodate 30 students, and Cabot House which can accommodate 10 students. A former schoolhouse and a teacher's cottage have been converted into a lecture facility and an apartment and a former shop has been converted into apartments. Memorial's Harlow Campus is not a school unto itself. Rather, professional schools and academic departments at Memorial use the Harlow Campus to deliver special programs. Harlow offers courses in Biology, Business, Drama & Performance, English Cultural Landscape, Fine Arts (both Theatre and Visual Arts), Faith, Love & Lore, and History & Political Science.

Signal Hill Campus
In 2013, Memorial University purchased the former Battery Hotel located on Signal Hill, overlooking St. John's harbour. The hotel was a landmark property with a long history in the cultural life of the province. To transform the space from a hotel to a university campus, a number of necessary upkeep and maintenance jobs were performed while Memorial conducted a province-wide public consultation to seek input from the Memorial University community and its public partners.

Emera Innovation Exchange
Signal Hill Campus opened to the public in September 2018. A large portion of the campus, the Emera Innovation Exchange, serves as Memorial's innovation and public engagement hub to facilitate university-community collaboration. The campus houses several public-facing university organizations, a large conference centre, and graduate student living accommodations.
Current tenants are the Harris Centre, Gardiner Centre, Genesis, Office of Public Engagement, Office of Strategic Operations (Signal Hill Campus) and Conference Services, MUN Pensioners' Association, Newfoundland Quarterly, and Business & Arts NL.
 
Conference Centre
The Conference Centre on Signal Hill Campus is a convening space within the Emera Innovation Exchange. It houses several distinct convening spaces, each with full AV connectivity. The Conference Hall overlooks St. John's harbour and can be divided into three separate venues, or combined as one larger venue with the capacity to host up to 450 people. The Atrium, a multifunctional event space spread over two levels and connected by a seated staircase, was designed to serve as a venue for public events and presentations. YAFFLE Connect, a space operating as a physical manifestation of the Yaffle application, Memorial's online connecting tool, was designed with small meetings, co-working sessions, dialogues and debates in mind. There are also eight meeting rooms on the lower level of the Atrium and a dining room with a built-in kitchen for private lunches or small dinner receptions.
 
Accommodations
The Harbour Wing and Tower areas of Signal Hill Campus are dedicated to graduate student living accommodations. There are 87 furnished rooms available, each of them single occupancy with a private washroom. The kitchen and lounge facilities on each floor are common areas shared between about 15 students.

Botanical Garden
The collection consists of perennial and annual plants, aquatic plants, spruce, fir, and alder trees. The garden, founded in 1972, is located at Oxen Pond along Mount Scio Road. The park has adopted the Twinflower (Linnaea borealis) as its emblem.

Student body and campus life
There are over 19,000 students currently enrolled in full and part-time studies at Memorial University.  This number includes both undergraduate and graduate students. Approximately 85% of students are from Newfoundland and Labrador.

International students
There are currently 2,744 full-time and part-time international students enrolled at Memorial, hailing from 119 countries around the world pursuing high-quality education with high ranking as well. International students comprise 15 percent of the student population, and are served by the Internationalisation Office, headquartered at Corte Real.

Campus housing
Student Residences provides on-campus housing at the St. John's campus in three residential complexes: Paton College, Macpherson College, and Burton's Pond Apartments. There is a dining hall for students in residence, R. Gushue Hall, serviced by Aramark. A meal plan is mandatory for students in Paton College and Macpherson College.

The Paton College dormitories offer traditional dormitory-style accommodations for approximately 1000 students in nine residences, called Houses, and named after persons associated with the university or Newfoundland and Labrador: Barnes, Blackall, Bowater, Burke, Curtis, Doyle, Hatcher, Rothermere, and Squires.

The newer Macpherson College consists of two similarly named Halls: Shiwak and Cluett, which house 250 students each, and were officially opened in 2013.

The five Courts of Burton's Pond apartments accommodate a total of 640 students (inclusive of any dependents) in four-bedroom apartments and provide a more independent lifestyle on campus. They are, in alphabetical order, Baltimore, Cabot, Cartier, Gilbert, and Guy.

Sports, clubs, and traditions
Memorial's sports teams, the Memorial Sea-Hawks (formerly The Beothuks), are part of the Atlantic University Sport (AUS) league of U Sports. There are varsity teams in men's and women's basketball, cross-country, soccer, swimming, and women's volleyball. Curling, track and field and wrestling are also available as club sports. The university also has student media, including a radio station, CHMR-FM, and a newspaper, The Muse.

Cultural impact

Postage stamp
On 1 January 1943, and again on 21 March 1946, 'Memorial University College' stamps were issued based on a design by Herman Herbert Schwartz. The 2¢ / 30¢ stamps were perforated 12 and were printed by the Canadian Bank Note Company, Limited.

Sponsors 
Memorial University's Faculty of Engineering and Applied Science and Faculty of Science are major sponsors of Women in Science and Engineering Newfoundland and Labrador (WISE NL). MUN has provided support to WISE NL's Student Summer Employment Program, Aboriginal Youth Conference, and the WinSETT Leadership Program - St. John's series.

Hudson and Rex 
The Canadian crime comedy/drama series Hudson & Rex, based on the Austrian show Inspector Rex, is filmed at Memorial University on a regular basis. The Bruneau Centre stands in for the headquarters of the fictional St. John's Police department, whilst the rest of the campus has been used to portray the equally fictional Heritage University of Newfoundland and Labrador.

Notable faculty and alumni

Arms

See also
 Canadian government scientific research organizations
 Canadian industrial research and development organizations
 Canadian Interuniversity Sport
 Canadian university scientific research organizations
 Higher education in Newfoundland and Labrador
 Memorial University of Newfoundland Students' Union

References

Books

External links

 Association of Universities and Colleges of Canada Profile
 Directory of Canadian Universities’ programs database
 Education: Newfoundland and Labrador Heritage
 Fact Book
 
 The Muse Memorial University's student newspaper

 
Educational institutions established in 1925
Universities and colleges in Newfoundland and Labrador
Universities in Canada
Distance education institutions based in Canada
1925 establishments in Newfoundland